Jamierra Faulkner (born March 9, 1992) is an American retired professional basketball player who played her entire career with the Chicago Sky of the Women's National Basketball Association (WNBA). She also played for UMMC Ekaterinburg. She was selected in the third round of the 2014 WNBA Draft, 34th overall. She retired for medical reasons in 2021.

College career
Faulkner played four years of basketball at Southern Miss.

College statistics

Source

References

1992 births
Living people
American women's basketball players
Basketball players from Florida
Chicago Sky draft picks
Chicago Sky players
Point guards
Southern Miss Lady Eagles basketball players
Sportspeople from West Palm Beach, Florida